Vasana may refer to:

Vasana (ship) or Bazana, a galley that was part of the Spanish Armada of 1588
Vāsanā, a technical term in Indian philosophy